KSP:Kapamilya Sabado Party is a musical variety show in the Philippines. It airs every Saturday before Pilipinas, Game Ka Na Ba? over ABS-CBN TV-4 Davao. It also airs in neighboring cities such as Davao and the whole of Mindanao. The show takes its inspiration from talent search and discovery program formats. It gives the floor to aspiring, talented Mindanao youngsters who act as guest hosts and performers. One of its noted segments of this show. In here a group of contestants undergo a certain task and the winner comes home with a cash prize and others with consolation prizes. In coordination with the MOR 101.1 (My Only Radio For Life! Davao) is their music segment entitled "Top picks of the week", top three most requested songs are featured in this segment. Every week local band plays in the studio bringing live music to the show.

History
The show was created in February 19, 2005 as a replacement for a Mindanao variety show like SBD Jam of ABS-CBN TV-4 Davao, Tsada of ABS-CBN TV-2 Cagayan de Oro (now TV-4 Cagayan de Oro) and Zambo Jambo of ABS-CBN TV-3 Zamboanga, which was already crippled following the departure of its main host Billy Joe Santos and Al Ryan Alejandre of SBD Jam. Only Rovic Cuasito was retained from the previous show while Jose "Beling" Rodriguez was promoted to direct the show. New talents like Claudette Centeno, Sam Mudanza and Ireen Dolor of SBD Jam and Halo-Halo Sunday Special. Also former Zambo Jambo co-host Vingo Arquiza, Alain Echem and Kikay Ranin to join as a co-host were introduced to the public as the new core group of the show. Kapamilya Sabado Party or KSP also started a practice where the most beautiful and handsome teens of Davao and Zamboanga were given hosting slots in the show, giving it feel to the show.

The show went out from its weekly broadcast from the ABS-CBN studio in Davao and held shows in out-of-town locations. Some Kapamilya stars from ABS-CBN Manila joined the cast in those shows. With the public now slowly taking notice of the show's renewed vigor following the reformat, the show was able to gain headway in Davao ratings aside from the fact that there were also loyal viewers abroad through TFC (The Filipino Channel).

On October 20, 2007, Kapamilya Sabado Party signed off as it gave way to Kapamilya Winner Ka! (now Kapamilya, Mas Winner Ka!), a multi-regional game show qualifier for ABS-CBN's Pilipinas, Game Ka Na Ba? premiering 27th of the same month. Patterned after the bingo game, Kapamilya Winner Ka contestants can win P5,000 to P10,000 in cash. The show has versions in Bacolod and Cebu. Rovic Cuasito was the main host of the said Davao City-based game show.

Cast

Final hosts
Rovic Cuasito
Claudette Centeno
Sam Mudanza
Ireen Dolor

Co-hosts
Tina Alteza
Glenn Antaran
Rachel Barnetson
Evan Benedicto
Nonoy Del Prado
Val Garcia
Marty Lam
Redge Ledesma
John Mendoza
Micay Mendoza
E.J Pantujan

See also
Kapamilya, Mas Winner Ka! (2007-2018; ABS-CBN Davao) 
ABS-CBN Regional Network Group
Sabado Barkada (2003-2007; ABS-CBN Bacolod)
Game Ka Na Ba?

Television in Davao City
2005 Philippine television series debuts
2007 Philippine television series endings
Philippine variety television shows
ABS-CBN Regional shows